Holly Lake is located in Grand Teton National Park, in the U. S. state of Wyoming. Holly Lake is situated in Paintbrush Canyon and is  SSW of Mount Woodring. Holly Lake is along a side trail of the Paintbrush Canyon-Cascade Canyon loop. There are backcountry camping zones nearby and three specifically designated within a quarter mile of the lake.

References

Lakes of Grand Teton National Park